United Nations Security Council resolution 1163, adopted unanimously on 17 April 1998, after reaffirming all previous resolutions on the Western Sahara, the Council extended the mandate of the United Nations Mission for the Referendum in Western Sahara (MINURSO) until 20 July 1998 so that it could proceed with voter identification tasks.

The Security Council reaffirmed the agreement between the Government of Morocco and the Polisario Front on the implementation of the Settlement Plan, and that the responsibility for voter identification was that of the Identification Commission. It also reiterated the need for a referendum on self-determination for the people of Western Sahara in accordance with the Settlement Plan.

After extending MINURSO's mandate until 20 July 1998, the resolution noted the continued deployment of engineering units and administrative staff required for demining and supporting the deployment of military personnel respectively and would consider a request for additional troops and police. The Council called upon the governments of Algeria, Mauritania and Morocco to sign Status of Forces Agreements with the United Nations.

The resolution concluded by directing the Secretary-General Kofi Annan to report to the Council every 30 days on the implementation of the current resolution and the mandate of MINURSO.

See also
 History of Western Sahara
 List of United Nations Security Council Resolutions 1101 to 1200 (1997–1998)
 Sahrawi Arab Democratic Republic
 Moroccan Western Sahara Wall

References

External links
 
Text of the Resolution at undocs.org

 1163
 1163
1998 in Morocco
 1163
 1163
 1163
April 1998 events